Nigel Patrick Dobbs (born 8 May 1962) is a former English cricketer.  Dobbs was a right-handed batsman who fielded as a wicket-keeper.  He was born in Scunthorpe, Lincolnshire.

Dobbs made his debut for Lincolnshire in the 1986 Minor Counties Championship against Northumberland.  Dobbs played Minor counties cricket for Lincolnshire from 1986 to 1994, which included 44 Minor Counties Championship matches and 13 MCCA Knockout Trophy matches.  He made his List A debut against Lancashire in the 1988 NatWest Trophy.  He played 2 further List A matches for Lincolnshire, against Nottinghamshire in the 1991 NatWest Trophy and Glamorgan in the 1994 NatWest Trophy.  In his 3 matches, he scored just 3 runs.

References

External links
Nigel Dobbs at ESPNcricinfo
Nigel Dobbs at CricketArchive

1962 births
Living people
Cricketers from Scunthorpe
English cricketers
Lincolnshire cricketers
Wicket-keepers